Liberty Township is an inactive township in Saline County, in the U.S. state of Missouri.

Liberty Township was erected in 1871, and named for the American concept of liberty.

References

Townships in Missouri
Townships in Saline County, Missouri